Gündüz or Gunduz is the Turkish word for daytime. It may refer to:

Given name
Gunduz Caginalp, American mathematician of Turkish descent
Gündüz Gürol Azer (born 1980), Turkish footballer
Gündüz Kılıç (1919–1980), Turkish football player and coach
Gündüz Tekin Onay (1942–2008), Turkish footballer and coach
Masatoshi Gündüz Ikeda (born 1926), Turkish mathematician of Japanese ancestry
Gündüz Alp, brother or grandfather of Osman I

Surname
Asım Can Gündüz (born 1955), Turkish rock and blues guitarist
Samet Gunduz (born 1987), Swiss footballer of Turkish descent
Seyhan Gündüz (born 1980), Turkish women's footballer

Other uses
Gece Gündüz, police procedural soap produced by the Altıoklar Productions
Gündüz, Silvan

Turkish-language surnames
Turkish masculine given names